The ferruginous antbird (Drymophila ferruginea) is an insectivorous bird in the antbird family Thamnophilidae. It is endemic to Atlantic Forest in south-eastern Brazil. It was formerly considered conspecific with the very similar Bertoni's antbird.

The ferruginous antbird was described by the Dutch zoologist Coenraad Jacob Temminck in 1822 and given the binomial name Myiothera ferruginea. It is now placed in the genus Drymophila which was introduced by the English naturalist William Swainson in 1824.
The specific epithet is from the Latin ferrugineus  "rusty-coloured" or "ferruginous".

References

External links

Xeno-canto: audio recordings of the ferruginous antbird

ferruginous antbird
Birds of the Atlantic Forest
Endemic birds of Brazil
ferruginous antbird
Taxonomy articles created by Polbot